Fort Apache is a 1948 American Western film directed by John Ford and starring John Wayne and Henry Fonda. The film was the first of the director's "Cavalry Trilogy" and was followed by She Wore a Yellow Ribbon (1949) and Rio Grande (1950), both also starring Wayne. The screenplay was inspired by James Warner Bellah's short story "Massacre" (1947). The historical sources for "Massacre" have been attributed both to George Armstrong Custer and the Battle of Little Bighorn and to the Fetterman Fight.

The film was one of the first to present an authentic and sympathetic view of Native Americans. In his review of the DVD release of  Fort Apache in 2012, New York Times movie critic Dave Kehr called it "one of the great achievements of classical American cinema, a film of immense complexity that never fails to reveal new shadings with each viewing" and "among the first 'pro-Indian' Westerns" in its portrayal of indigenous Americans with "sympathy and respect".

The film was awarded the Best Director and Best Cinematography awards by the Locarno International Film Festival of Locarno, Switzerland. Screenwriter Frank S. Nugent was nominated for best screenplay by the Writers Guild of America.

Plot
After the American Civil War, highly respected veteran Captain Kirby York (John Wayne) is expected to replace the outgoing commander at Fort Apache, an isolated U.S. cavalry post. York had commanded his own regiment during the Civil War and was well-qualified to assume permanent command. To the surprise and disappointment of the company, command of the regiment was given to Lieutenant Colonel Owen Thursday (Henry Fonda). Thursday, a West Point graduate, was a general during the Civil War. Despite his Civil War combat record, Lieutenant Colonel Thursday is an arrogant and egocentric officer who lacks experience dealing with Native Americans, and in particular local tribes with their unique cultures and traditions.

Accompanying widower Thursday is his daughter, Philadelphia (Shirley Temple). She becomes attracted to Second Lieutenant Michael Shannon O'Rourke (John Agar), the son of Sergeant Major Michael O'Rourke (Ward Bond). The elder O'Rourke was a recipient of the Medal of Honor as a major with the Irish Brigade during the Civil War, entitling his son to enter West Point and become an officer. However, the class-conscious Thursday forbids his daughter to see someone whom he does not consider an equal and a gentleman.

When unrest arises among the Apache, led by Cochise (Miguel Inclán), Thursday ignores York's advice to treat the tribes with honor and to remedy problems on the reservation caused by corrupt Apache agent Silas Meacham (Grant Withers). Thursday's inability to deal with Meacham effectively, due to his rigid interpretation of Army regulations stating that Meacham is an agent of the United States government, so entitled to Army protection (despite his own personal contempt for the man), coupled with Thursday's prejudicial and arrogant ignorance regarding the Apache, drives the Apaches to rebel. Eager for glory and recognition, Thursday orders his regiment into battle on Cochise's terms, a direct charge into the hills, despite York's urgent warnings that such a move would be suicidal. Thursday relieves York and orders him to stay back, replacing him with Captain Sam Collingwood (George O'Brien).

Following Thursday's orders, York spares the younger O'Rourke from battle. Thursday's command is nearly wiped out, but a few soldiers manage to escape back to the ridge where Captain York is positioned. Thursday himself survives, but then returns to die with the last of his trapped men. Cochise spares York and the rest of the detachment because he knows York to be an honorable man.

Several years later, a now Lieutenant Colonel Kirby York commands the regiment. Meeting with correspondents, he introduces Lt. O'Rourke, now married to Philadelphia Thursday with a young son. A reporter asks Colonel York if he has seen the famous painting depicting "Thursday's Charge". York, about to command a new and arduous campaign to bring in the Apaches, while believing that Thursday was a poor tactician who led a foolhardy and suicidal charge, says it is completely accurate and then reminds the reporters that the soldiers will never be forgotten as long as the regiment lives.

Cast

 John Wayne as Captain Kirby York
 Henry Fonda as Lieutenant Colonel Owen Thursday
 Shirley Temple as Miss Philadelphia Thursday
 John Agar as Second Lieutenant Michael Shannon "Mickey" O'Rourke
 Ward Bond as Sergeant Major Michael O'Rourke
 Irene Rich as Mary O'Rourke
 Anna Lee as Emily Collingwood
 George O'Brien as Captain Sam Collingwood
 Guy Kibbee as First Lieutenant Wilkens, regimental surgeon
 Ray Hyke as Lieutenant Gates, regimental adjutant
 Mae Marsh as Mrs. Gates
 Victor McLaglen as Sergeant Festus Mulcahy
 Dick Foran as Sergeant Quincannon
 Pedro Armendáriz as Sergeant Beaufort
 Jack Pennick as Sergeant Daniel Schattuck
 Frank McGrath as Corporal Derice (uncredited)
 Philip Kieffer as a Trooper (credited as Keiffer)
 Fred Graham as a Trooper (uncredited)
 Danny Borzage as recruit/accordionist (uncredited)
 Hank Worden as Southern recruit
 Miguel Inclán as Cochise
 Grant Withers as Silas Meacham
 Movita as Guadalupe, Colonel Thursday's household cook
 Mary Gordon as Ma (Barmaid)
 Cliff Clark as Stage Driver (uncredited)
 Francis Ford as Fen (Stage Guard) (uncredited)
 Frank Ferguson as Newspaperman (uncredited)
 William Forrest as Reporter (uncredited)
 Archie R. Twitchell as Reporter (uncredited)
 Harry Tenbrook as Tom O'Feeney (uncredited)
 Mickey Simpson as NCO at dance (uncredited)
 Jane Crowley as Officer's Wife (uncredited)

Note: At the time of filming, Shirley Temple and John Agar were married in real life.

Production

Screenplay 
The Irish theme to the background of some of the troopers may be a nod to the service on both sides during the Civil War, as does the recruit who had allegedly served under Nathan Bedford Forrest. The role of Sergeant Major Michael O'Rourke (and his son) may be a thinly disguised tribute to 'Paddy' Patrick O'Rorke killed leading the 140th New York Volunteer Regiment in a desperate charge to shore up the right flank of Strong Vincent's Brigade on Little Round Top at the Battle of Gettysburg, July 2, 1863.

Filming
Some exteriors for the film's location shooting were shot in Monument Valley, Arizona. The exteriors involving the fort itself and the renegade Apache agent's trading post were filmed at the Corriganville Movie Ranch, a former Simi Hills movie ranch that is now a regional park in the Simi Valley of Southern California.

Reception
The film recorded a profit of $445,000.

The film is recognized by American Film Institute in its 2008 AFI's 10 Top 10: Nominated Western film.

Other rankings 
Fort Apache is commonly ranked among the most significant films of the "cowboy/western" genre, including these rankings:
 "Top-Grossing Westerns from 1930–1972 and Plot Classification" per Wright, W. (1975) in Six guns and society: A structural study of the Western (pp. 30–32). Berkeley, CA: University of California Press. 
 #43 in the "Top 100 Westerns": Western Writers of America
 #28 of 92 in "Chronological Listing of Major and Representative Western Films" (Cawelti, 1999)
 #28 in "Chronological Listing of 100 Major and Representative Western Films" (Hausladen, 2003)
 #19 in "Top 100 Western Films (1914–2001)" (Hoffmann, 2003)
 #11 in "AFI’s 50 Western Nominees" (American Film Institute)
 #25 in "100 Greatest Western Movies of All-time" (American Cowboy Magazine, 2008)
Additionally, the principal actors were ranked (for this and their other films):
 #6 (Henry Fonda) and #13 (John Wayne) in the "AFI’s 50 Greatest American Screen Legends", American Film Institute

See also
 List of American films of 1948
 John Wayne filmography
 Fort Apache (disambiguation)
 Fort Apache, the Bronx (a 1981 crime film, starring Paul Newman)
 Henry Fonda filmography
 Shirley Temple filmography

References

Further reading
  In his contemporary review, Crowther writes "apparent in this picture, for those who care to look, is a new and maturing viewpoint upon one aspect of the American Apache wars. For here it is not the "heathen Indian [sic]" who is the "heavy" of the piece but a hard-bitten Army colonel, blind through ignorance and a passion for revenge. And ranged alongside this willful white man is a venal government agent who exploits the innocence of the Indians while supposedly acting as their friend".
  Recent, highly favorable review of "John Ford's superb black-and white elegiac Western".
  Schwartz summarizes the film as "a reworking of the Custer myth, in a film that over sentimentalizes Army life and chivalry".

External links

 
 
 
 
 

1948 Western (genre) films
1948 films
American Western (genre) films
Western (genre) cavalry films
Apache Wars films
Films based on short fiction
Films directed by John Ford
Films set in Arizona
Films shot in Utah
RKO Pictures films
American black-and-white films
1940s English-language films
1940s American films
Films shot in Monument Valley